The 1974 Eastern Michigan Hurons football team represented Eastern Michigan University as an independent during the 1974 NCAA Division II football season. In their first season under head coach George Mans, the Hurons compiled a 4–6–1 record and were outscored by their opponents, 178 to 143.

Coach Mans had been an assistant football coach at the University of Michigan since 1966.  He was hired by Eastern Michigan in February 1974. In his first season as head coach, the Hurons started the season with only one win in the first four games, but the team finished strong, going 3–2–1 in the final five games.  The team's victories were against Western Michigan (20–19), Northern Michigan (24–0), Ball State (17–9), and Toledo (28–12).

Schedule

See also
 1974 in Michigan

References

Eastern Michigan
Eastern Michigan Eagles football seasons
Eastern Michigan Hurons football